Stephen Miller may refer to:

 Stephen Miller (Minnesota governor) (1816–1881), American Republican politician
 Stephen Decatur Miller (1787–1838), American politician
 Stephen G. Miller (1942–2021), American archaeologist
 Stephen Miller (athlete) (born 1980), British athlete
 Stephen Miller (political advisor) (born 1985), American presidential advisor, member of the Trump administration
 Stephen Paul Miller (born 1951), American poet and academic
 Stephen Miller (writer) (born 1941), American author
 Stephen A. Miller, American entrepreneur
 Stephen E. Miller, Canadian and American actor, screenwriter and director, in the 1999 movie Final Run

See also 
 Steve Miller (disambiguation)
 Stephan Miller (1968–2008), animal trainer